The 2018 Garden Open was a professional tennis tournament played on clay courts. It was the tenth edition of the tournament which was part of the 2018 ATP Challenger Tour. It took place in Rome, Italy between 7 and 12 May 2018.

Singles main-draw entrants

Seeds

 1 Rankings as of 30 April 2018.

Other entrants
The following players received wildcards into the singles main draw:
  Riccardo Balzerani
  Raúl Brancaccio
  Giovanni Fonio
  Gianluigi Quinzi

The following player received entry into the singles main draw as a special exempt:
  Matteo Viola

The following player received entry into the singles main draw as an alternate:
  Rogério Dutra Silva

The following players received entry from the qualifying draw:
  Íñigo Cervantes
  Andreas Haider-Maurer
  Kevin Krawietz
  Bernabé Zapata Miralles

The following players received entry as lucky losers:
  Patricio Heras
  Roberto Marcora
  Alberto Romero de Ávila Senise

Champions

Singles

  Adam Pavlásek def.  Laslo Đere 7–6(7–1), 6–7(9–11), 6–4.

Doubles

  Kevin Krawietz /  Andreas Mies def.  Sander Gillé /  Joran Vliegen 6–3, 2–6, [10–4].

References

2018 ATP Challenger Tour
2018
 in Italian tennis